Sydney Turner (2 April 1814 – 26 June 1879) was an Anglican clergyman, Dean of Ripon from December 1875  until March 1876.
He was born in 1814, the youngest son of the historian Sharon Turner, and educated at Trinity College, Cambridge. He was ordained in 1837 and became a curate at Christ Church, Southwark. He was for many years an Inspector of Industrial and Reformatory Schools. He was Chaplain to the Philanthropic Society for the reformation of juvenile offenders from 1842 to 1857. An Inspector of prisons from 1858 to 1867, in 1858 he delivered a sermon to open the meeting of the National Association for the Promotion of Social Science. He was Rector of Hempsted from 1867 to 1875, and again (after his brief spell as Dean of Ripon) from 1876 until his death

He died on 26 June 1879.

Works
 Report on the system and arrangements of "La colonie agricole" at Mettray, 1846
 Reformatory Schools. A Letter to C. B. Adderley, Esq., M.P, 1848
 Pray for us : a farewell sermon, preached in the Philanthropic Society's Chapel, St. George's Fields, on Sunday, April 16, 1849, 1849
 First report of the inspector appointed, under the provisions of the Act 5 & 6 Will.IV.c.38, to visit the different reformatory schools of Great Britain, 1858

References

1814 births
Alumni of Trinity College, Cambridge
Deans of Ripon
1879 deaths